Marija Lugarić (born 1 June 1978 in Zagreb) is a Croatian centre-left politician representing the Social Democratic Party of Croatia (SDP), currently the biggest opposition party in Croatia.  She was first elected to the Croatian parliament in the 2000 election, and currently specialises in criticising education policy legislation.

External links
Ms Lugarić's official blog 
Profile on Croatian parliament site 
 Biography on the Social Democratic Party of Croatia website 
PoliWiki(Marija Lugarić) 

21st-century Croatian women politicians
21st-century Croatian politicians
1978 births
Living people
Representatives in the modern Croatian Parliament
Social Democratic Party of Croatia politicians
Politicians from Zagreb